This is a list of notable alumni of the University of Idaho and a list of its presidents.

Alumni

Academia
 Ali Abdelghany - prominent Egyptian academic and marine biologist; Ph.D. '86

Administration
 Jesse Buchanan - tenth president of the university (1946–54), previously dean of engineering; B.S.C.E. '27, M.S. '29
 Lawrence Henry Chamberlain - former dean of Columbia College (1950–1958) and vice president of Columbia University (1962–1967); B.S. '30
 C. Scott Green - nineteenth president of the university (2019– ); Class of '84
 James Henry Meyer Chancellor of the University of California, Davis from 1969-1987; B.S. '47

Business

 William Agee - business executive; Class of '60
 Jack Lemley - construction manager for Europe's Channel Tunnel or "Chunnel," the undersea rail tube linking England and France; Class of '60
 Frank Shrontz - former chairman and CEO (1986–96) of Boeing; LL.B. '54

Criminals
 Anthony Curcio - former Vandal football player; real estate investor; masterminded one of the most elaborate armored car heists in history

Government

Journalism
 Michael Kirk, documentary filmmaker and co-creator of Frontline; Class of '71
 Kelli Johnson, sports anchor for NBC Sports Bay Area, Class of 1998
 Otis Livingston, sportscaster for WCBS-TV in New York
 David Neiwert, Seattle-based investigative journalist and blogger (Orcinus); contributing writer for the Southern Poverty Law Center; author of Of Orcas and Men: What Killer Whales Can Teach Us (2015); Class of 1984

Literature and the arts

Military
 James F. Amos - Commandant of the Marine Corps (2010–2014); Class of 1970

Science
 Steven Amstrup - polar bear researcher and conservationist;  M.S. '75
 Malcolm Renfrew - polymer chemist, inventor, and professor emeritus; contributor to the development of Teflon;  Class of '32, M.S. '34
 Bob Twiggs - Rocket scientist; inventor of the CubeSat technology; Class of '61
Thomas Mueller - American rocket engineer and rocket engine designer. He is a founding employee of SpaceX, a space transport services company headquartered in Hawthorne, California.

Sports

Olympics
 Kristin Armstrong, cyclist; 2008 and 2012 Olympic gold medalist (women's time trial); Class of '95
 Hec Edmundson, state's first Olympian in 1912 (7th in 800 m, 6th in 400 m); Class of 1910 (see entry under "Basketball")
 Dan O'Brien, 1996 Olympic gold medalist (decathlon), three-time world champion; Class of '93
 Joachim Olsen, 2004, Olympic bronze medalist (shot put) for Denmark and NCAA champion; Class of '02
 Chris Stokes, five-time Olympic bobsledder for Jamaica; Class of '87
 Angela Whyte, 2004 Olympic finalist (100 m hurdles); 2008 representative for Canada; four-time NCAA All-American; Class of '03

Baseball
 Bob Dillinger - MLB third baseman; three-time AL stolen base champion; Class of '40
 Frank Reberger - MLB pitcher (1968–72); Class of '66
 Ken Schrom - MLB pitcher (1980–87); former Vandal quarterback; Class of '77
 Bill Stoneman - MLB pitcher (1967–74); threw two MLB no-hitters; GM of L.A. Angels (1999–2007); Class of '66

Basketball
 Steve Belko - head coach at Idaho State and Oregon; third commissioner of Big Sky Conference; also starred in football for Vandals; Class of '39
 Hec Edmundson - basketball and track coach at UI and Washington; Class of 1910
 Gus Johnson - NBA star (power forward) (1963–73); played for Vandals during the 1962–63 season; Class of '64
 Dan Monson - head coach at Long Beach State; formerly at Gonzaga and Minnesota; Class of '85
 Don Monson - head coach at UI (1978–83) and Oregon; father of Dan Monson; Class of '55
 Don Newman - head coach at Arizona State and NBA assistant coach (Spurs: 2002–12); Big Sky player of the year (1980)

Football

Faculty

Current
 Douglas Q. Adams - Emeritus Professor of English
 Kim Barnes - Professor of English
 Daniel Bukvich - Professor of Music
 Ruprecht Machleidt - Professor of Physics
 Daniel Orozco - Associate Professor of English
 J. Michael Scott - Emeritus Professor of Fish & Wildlife
 Jean'ne Shreeve - Professor of Chemistry
 Jack Ernest Vincent - Emeritus Professor of Political Science
 Robert Wrigley - Professor of English
 Dev Shrestha - Professor of Chemical & Biological Engineering

Former
 John Merton Aldrich - zoology
 Darrell Bolz - agricultural extension
 David Comer - electrical engineering
 James Gill - painting
 Gustaf Wilhelm Hammar - political science
 Ralph C. Hancock - political science
 Lawrence H. Johnston - physics
 Robert Peters - creative writing
 Malcolm Renfrew - chemistry
 Vern Rutsala - creative writing
 Roderick Sprague - anthropology and archaeology
 David B. Steinman - engineering
 Yvor Winters - creative writing
 Gordon Woods - veterinary science

Presidents of the University of Idaho
The following individuals have held the office of President of the University of Idaho.

References

 
University of Idaho
University of Idaho people